Game.EXE is a now-defunct monthly Russian video game magazine. It was initially launched titled Toy Shop from March 1995 to December 1996. Starting 1997, it was renamed Game.EXE and ran until June 2006, with the last 4 issues all published in June.

References

External links
 Archived Game.EXE magazines on the Internet Archive

1995 establishments in Russia
2006 disestablishments in Russia
Bi-monthly magazines
Defunct magazines published in Russia
Magazines established in 1995
Magazines disestablished in 2006
Magazines published in Moscow
Monthly magazines published in Russia
Video game magazines published in Russia